T. Jefferson Parker (born 1953) is an American novelist.  Parker's books are police procedurals set in Southern California.

Early life and career
Parker was born in 1953 in Los Angeles, California, and he has lived his entire life in Southern California.  He was named T. Jefferson Parker.  The "T" doesn't stand for anything. His mother said she thought it would look good on the presidential letterhead. He was educated in public schools and received his bachelor's degree from the University of California, Irvine in English.  He began his writing career as a journalist for The Newport Ensign.  Parker later switched jobs to the Daily Pilot, winning three Orange County Press Club Awards.  It was at this time that he began writing his first novel, Laguna Heat.  He received the Edgar Award for Best Novel in 2002 for Silent Joe and again in 2005 for California Girl. In 2008, his short story "Skinhead Central" won Parker another Edgar award, making him one of the elite few writers to have won the Edgar three times.

Writing style
Parker's stories usually have one protagonist, and occasionally part of the story will be shown from the antagonist's point of view.  His stories usually build suspense as the protagonist tries to prevent further crimes.  The crimes depicted in the story are usually gruesome acts, which cause much unrest in the town where the story is set. Parker is renowned for using California settings and depicting the effects of crime on a community.

He draws on his experience as a lifelong California resident. Although most of his work is set in Orange County and Los Angeles County, he has relocated to San Diego and some of his more recent writing is set there.

Life
Parker lives in Southern California, where he writes and spends time with his family.  His hobbies include hiking, hunting, fishing, and playing tennis.

Novels
Stand Alone Novels
 Laguna Heat (1985)
 Little Saigon (1987)
 Pacific Beat (1991)
 Summer of Fear (1993)
 The Triggerman's Dance (1996)
 Where Serpents Lie (1998)
 Silent Joe (2001)
 Cold Pursuit (2003)
 California Girl (2004)
 The Fallen (2006)
 Storm Runners (2007)
 Full Measure (2014)
 Crazy Blood (2016)
A Thousand Steps (2022)

Roland Ford series

 The Room Of White Fire (2017)
 Swift Vengeance (2018)
 The Last Good Guy (2019)
 Then She Vanished (2020)

Charlie Hood series

 L.A. Outlaws (2008)
 The Renegades (2009)
 Iron River (2010)
 The Border Lords (2011)
 The Jaguar (2012)
 The Famous and the Dead (2013)

Merci Rayborn series
 The Blue Hour (1999)
 Red Light (2000)
 Black Water (2002)

As editor
 Hook, Line & Sinister (2010)

Notes

References
Interview with and Biography of T. Jefferson Parker

External links
T. Jefferson Parker's Official Website
Interview with T. Jefferson Parker
 1988 audio interview with T. Jefferson Parker at Wired for Books.org by Don Swaim
T. Jefferson Parker Fansite
The VJ Books Podcast Interview with T. Jefferson Parker Talking About "A Thousand Steps," December, 2021.

1953 births
Living people
20th-century American novelists
21st-century American novelists
American male novelists
American mystery writers
Edgar Award winners
Writers from Los Angeles
20th-century American male writers
21st-century American male writers